French football club SC Bastia's 2008–09 season. Finished 11th place in league. Top scorer of the season, including 10 goals in 10 league matches have been Pierre-Yves André. Was eliminated to Coupe de France 8. round, the Coupe de la Ligue was able to be among the final 32 teams.

Transfers

In 
Summer
 Macedo Novaes from Arles
 Ludovic Genest from Auxerre
 Salim Moizini from Saint-Priest
 Abdelmalek Cherrad from MC Alger
 Mehdi Méniri from Al-Khor
 Jean-François Grimaldi from Bastia B
 Sony Mustivar from Bastia B
 Wahbi Khazri from Bastia B
 Darko Dunjić from Zorya Luhansk
 Yamen Ben Zekri from Zamalek
 Hervé Kambou and Nassa Guy Roland Niangbo from Olympic Charleroi
 Issoumaila Dao from free

Winter
 Nicolas Marin from Lorient
 Éric Cubilier from free

Out 
Summer
 Gary Coulibaly to Istres
 Chaouki Ben Saada and Kafoumba Coulibaly to Nice
 Grégory Lorenzi to Brest
 Xavier Pentecôte to Toulouse
 Alexandre Licata to AS Monaco
 Damien Bridonneau to Vannes
 Jean-Louis Leca to Valenciennes
 Samir Bertin d'Avesnes to Evian

Winter
 No.

Squad

Ligue 2

League table

Results summary

Results by round

Matches

Coupe de France

Coupe de la Ligue

Statistics

Top scorers

League top assists

References 

SC Bastia seasons
Bastia